Zenpo may refer to:
Zenpo Shimabukuro, Karate master, son of Zenryō Shimabukuro (1908–1969)
Komparu Zempō (1454–1520?), actor and playwright 
Zenpo Kaiten, a forward roll in Judo
Zenpo-koenfun, keyhole-shaped mounds found on Kofun megalithic tombs or tumuli in Japan, constructed between the early 3rd century and the early 7th century CE
Zenpo Temple in Tsuruoka, Yamagata